Hughes Entertainment was an American film production company and music label founded by filmmaker John Hughes. It was closed in 2002.

Foundation 
The studio was founded in 1987 by American film producer John Hughes as The John Hughes Company. It was initially based at Universal Pictures, through a three-year production agreement, in order to produce, direct and write two to three pictures a year in order to develop from their own development ideas. The company was subsequently moved to Paramount Pictures in 1985. The company then spent various deals at Warner Bros. and 20th Century Fox throughout the end of the late 1980s and early 1990s. The company produced movies such as Curly Sue, Home Alone and Miracle on 34th Street.

Films 
List of the films writer produced and directors:

Notes 

Film production companies of the United States
Television production companies of the United States
American companies established in 1987
Entertainment companies established in 1987
Mass media companies established in 1987
Companies established in 1987
Entertainment companies disestablished in 2002
Mass media companies disestablished in 2002
Companies disestablished in 2002